The 1985 James Hardie 1000 was a motor race held on 6 October 1985 at the Mount Panorama Circuit just outside Bathurst, in New South Wales, Australia. It was the 26th running of the Bathurst 1000 and was the first held exclusively for cars complying with the Australian version of International Group A touring car regulations. The event, which was organised by the Australian Racing Drivers Club Ltd, was Round Four of both the 1985 Australian Endurance Championship and the 1985 Australian Manufacturers' Championship.

The race was dominated by the Tom Walkinshaw Racing run Jaguar XJ-S's, which finished first and third. John Goss and German driver Armin Hahne claimed the victory with team owner Tom Walkinshaw and his co-driver Win Percy finishing three laps down in third. On the same lap as the winning Jaguar was the Schnitzer Motorsport prepared BMW 635CSi of Italian driver Roberto Ravaglia and Venezuela's former Motorcycle World champion (and ex-Formula One driver) Johnny Cecotto who, despite their extensive overseas experience, were Bathurst rookies and as such easily co-won the Rookie of the Year award. The Holden Dealer Team Holden VK Commodore of Peter Brock and New Zealand open-wheel racer David Oxton was in second place with three laps to go when it broke a timing chain and retired.

1985 was the first Great Race since 1968 in which four-time winner Allan Moffat was not an entrant. Left without a drive in 1985 after the withdrawal of Mazda from Australian touring car racing, Moffat was guest expert commentator with race broadcaster Channel 7.

Class structure
The race was held for cars complying with the Australian version of International Group A touring car regulations with three engine capacity classes.

Class A - Up to 2000 cc
Six cars were entered for Class A, including four Toyotas, two of them factory supported, an Alfa Romeo Alfetta which did not start and a Volvo 360 which also failed to start.

Class B - 2001-3000 cc
With a multiplication factor of 1.3 applied to cars with turbocharged engines, a 2000cc car with a turbocharger was rated at 2600cc for the purposes of the class structure. This saw the factory supported turbocharged Mitsubishi Starions and a Volvo 240 compete against non-turbo Audi 5+5, Toyota Celica Supra and the factory-backed Alfa Romeo GTV6. It was the first time since the 1973 race that there was no Ford Capri on the grid.

Class C - Over 3000 cc 
The class featured Holden VK Commodore V8s (in both 5.0 litre and 4.9 litre configuration), the big V12 Jaguar XJ-S', the V8 Ford Mustang GT's and Rover Vitesses and the Straight-six BMW 635 CSi. Both the Rovers and BMW's used 3.5 litre engines, though unlike the BMW, the Rover was a V8.

Hardies Heroes

* Tom Walkinshaw's pole time of 2:18.822 in his Group A Jaguar XJ-S was 0.138 seconds faster than he had qualified John Goss' Group C Jaguar XJS in Hardie's Heroes the previous year. It was also the first time a driver had gone from being the slowest in the runoff one year to being the fastest a year later. The fastest non-Jaguar was the turbocharged Volvo 240T driven by Bathurst Rookie Robbie Francevic which recorded . The Volvo was also the only turbo powered car in the runoff.* With Walkinshaw on pole and teammate Jeff Allam in second, 1985 was the first and so far only year that cars powered by V12 engines have filled the front row of the grid at Bathurst. It was also the first time since Peter Brock and Colin Bond had qualified 1-2 for the Holden Dealer Team in 1974 that one team had occupied the front row.* The No. 18 DJR Ford Mustang driven by Larry Perkins was officially withdrawn from the race following Hardies Heroes. Every car on the grid that qualified behind the car was then was moved up one grid position. The car had been entered as an insurance policy should something happen to keep the #17 Mustang out of the race, and to give drivers Dick Johnson and Perkins the maximum amount of practice time before the race.* For the first time there were 11 cars and not 10 in the runoff. The ARDC had originally bumped the Larry Perkins Mustang believing (correctly) that it would not start the race despite persistent rumours that it would, and included in its place the BMW 635 CSi of Roberto Ravaglia. However, DJR protested as their car had provisionally qualified 8th. As the ARDC had no grounds to exclude it as regulations stated the top 8 qualifiers were an automatic inclusion, the runoff went ahead with both Perkins and Ravaglia taking part.* 1985 was the only time Peter Brock was out-qualified by one of his HDT teammates in Hardie's Heroes, qualifying 0.132 behind David Parsons, who was listed only as co-driver to 1983 race winner John Harvey in the No. 7 car. Prior to this the closest a teammate had got to him in HH was when Harvey was only 1.19 seconds slower in 1980. 1985 would also be the only time that the HDT had the slowest two cars in the runoff.* The fastest driver in official qualifying, 1974 winner John Goss, made his first and only appearance in Hardie's Heroes. Goss' Jaguar had also qualified for the shootout in 1984 but Tom Walkinshaw was at the wheel.

Official results
Bold donates outright and class winners

Statistics
 Provisional Pole Position - #10 John Goss - 2:19.77
 Pole Position – #8 Tom Walkinshaw – 2:18.822
 Fastest Lap – #10 John Goss – 2:21.86
 Average Speed – 150 km/h
 Race Time - 6:41:30.19

External links
 James Hardie 1000 Bathurst 1985, www.touringcarracing.net, as archived at web.archive.org
 1985 James Hardie 1000, www.uniquecarsandparts.com.au

References

Motorsport in Bathurst, New South Wales
James Hardie 1000